Maurine is an unincorporated community in Meade County, in the U.S. state of South Dakota.

History
A post office called Maurine was established in 1926, and remained in operation until 1960. The community has the name of Maurine Price, the daughter of a pioneer merchant.

References

Unincorporated communities in Meade County, South Dakota
Unincorporated communities in South Dakota